This is a list of the Hungarian women's handball transfers for the 2011 summer transfer window. Only transfers that feature at least one Nemzeti Bajnokság I club and that were completed after the end of the winter 2010–11 transfer window and before the end of the 2011 summer window are listed.

Transfers by team

Alcoa FKC RightPhone

In

  Ana Maruščec (from ŽRK Zamet Rijeka)
  Sandra Nikčević (from RK Podravka Koprivnica)
  Ana Nikšić (on loan from RK Lokomotiva Zagreb)
  Virág Vaszari (from Váci NKSE)

Out

  Fruzsina Azari (to Veszprém Barabás KC)
  Nóra Csákovics (to Kiskunhalas NKSE)
  Nóra Dancs (to Kispesti NKK)
  Ivett Kaszás (retired)
  Olha Vashchuk (to Rostov-Don)
  Melinda Vincze (to ÉTV-Érdi VSE)

Budapest Bank-Békéscsabai Előre NKSE

In

  Gyöngyi Drávai (from Győri Audi ETO KC)
  Ivana Ljubas (from RK Zagorje)
  Flóra Sipeki (from Váci NKSE)
  Tímea Szögi (back from maternity leave)
  Szilvia Tarjányi (from Veszprém Barabás KC)
  Jasna Tošković (from ŽRK Naisa Niš)

Out

  Bernadett Bódi (to Siófok KC-Galerius Fürdő)
  Anita Cifra (to FTC-Rail Cargo Hungaria)
  Kitti Kudor (to DVSC-Fórum)
  Emese Mózes-Rácz (on maternity leave)
  Olha Nikolayenko (to CJF Fleury Loiret HB)
  Klára Szekeres (to ÉTV-Érdi VSE)

Dunaújvárosi NKS

 

In

  Renáta Gerstmár (from Veszprém Barabás KC)
  Boglárka Hosszu (from Siófok KC-Galerius Fürdő)
  Szilvia Lázár (from Tecton WAT Atzgersdorf)
  Vivien Víg (on loan from Győri Audi ETO KC)

Out

  Beatrix Balogh (to Marcali VSZSE)
  Anna Felső (to Kecskeméti NKSE)
  Ivett Nagy (to Veszprém Barabás KC)  Ágnes Győri (Marcali VSZSE)
  Bojana Radulovics (retired)
  Sarolta Selmeczi (to Veszprém Barabás KC)
  Viktória Velky (to Szeged KKSE)

DVSC-Fórum

In

  Annamária Király (from Veszprém Barabás KC)
  Mercédesz Karnik (from Hajdúnánás Termál SC)
  Kitti Kudor (from Budapest Bank-Békéscsabai Előre NKSE)
  Vivien Léránt (on loan from Hypo Niederösterreich)
  Gabriella Szűcs (from CS Oltchim Râmnicu Vâlcea)

Out

  Annamária Bogdanovics (to Siófok KC-Galerius Fürdő)
  Barbara Bognár (to ÉTV-Érdi VSE)
  Rita Borbás (to UKSE Szekszárd)
  Anita Bulath (to Veszprém Barabás KC)
  Dóra Dublinszki (to Veszprém Barabás KC)
  Gabriella Juhász (to Veszprém Barabás KC)
  Éva Kiss (to Veszprém Barabás KC)
  Renáta Mörtel (to Siófok KC-Galerius Fürdő)
  Viktória Pácz (to Angoulême Charente HB)
  Valéria Szabó (to Zvezda Zvenigorod)

ÉTV-Érdi VSE

In

  Barbara Bognár (from DVSC-Fórum)
  Anna Úrsúla Guðmundsdóttir (from Valur Reykjavík)
  Klára Szekeres (from Békéscsabai Előre NKSE)
  Melinda Vincze (from Alcoa FKC RightPhone)
  Sara Vukčević (on loan from ŽRK Budućnost Podgorica)

Out

  Edina Burai (to UKSE Szekszárd)
  Judit Ferencz (to Budaörs-Érdi VSE II)
  Krisztina Gyetván (to Váci NKSE)
  Anna Úrsúla Guðmundsdóttir (terminated contract)
  Ildikó Megyes  (to Budaörs-Érdi VSE II)
  Helga Németh (retired)
  Cecília Őri  (to Budaörs-Érdi VSE II)
  Réka Schneck  (to Budaörs-Érdi VSE II)

FTC-Rail Cargo Hungaria

In

  Anita Cifra (from Budapest Bank-Békéscsabai Előre NKSE)
  Jelena Živković (from RK Zaječar)

Out

  Helga Albert (to Kispesti NKK)
  Brigitta Andrási (on loan to Kispesti NKK)
  Barbara Balogh (to TuS Metzingen)
  Regina Bari-Nagy (to TuS Metzingen)
  Maja Mayer (to Veszprém Barabás KC)
  Mária Mohácsik (on loan to Kispesti NKK)
  Csilla Németh (to Siófok KC-Galerius Fürdő)
  Anikó Szamoránsky (to Kiskunhalas NKSE)
  Noémi Trufán (to VfL Wolfsburg)

Győri Audi ETO KC

In

  Andrea Lekić (from RK Krim Ljubljana)
  Heidi Løke (from Larvik HK)
  Jovanka Radičević (from ŽRK Budućnost Podgorica)

Out

  Aurelia Brădeanu (to CS Oltchim Râmnicu Vâlcea)
  Gyöngyi Drávai (to Budapest Bank-Békéscsabai Előre NKSE)
  Szabina Mayer (to Veszprém Barabás KC)
  Katarína Mravíková (retired)
  Viktória Oguntoye (on loan to ÉTV-Érdi VSE)
  Simona Spiridon (to Zvezda Zvenigorod)
  Patricia Szölösi 
  Vivien Víg (on loan to Dunaújvárosi NKS)

Kiskunhalas NKSE

In

  Nóra Csákovics (from Alcoa FKC RightPhone)
  Viktória Fehér (from Szentendrei NKE)
  Adél Kosik (from CB Salud Tenerife)
  Andrea Scholtz (from Siófok KC-Galerius Fürdő)
  Andrea Sterbik (from Veszprém Barabás KC)
  Anikó Szamoránsky (from FTC-Rail Cargo Hungaria}

Out

  Kinga Domokos (to Orosházi NKC)
  Anna Kapási
  Dóra Karsai (retired)
  Orsolya Kiss 
  Erika Virág (retired)

Siófok KC-Galerius Fürdő

In

  Szilvia Ábrahám (from Veszprém Barabás KC)
  Bernadett Bódi (from Budapest Bank-Békéscsabai Előre NKSE)  Annamária Bogdanovics (from DVSC-Fórum)  Orsolya Herr (from Váci NKSE)  Renáta Mörtel (from DVSC-Fórum)
  Csilla Németh (from FTC-Rail Cargo Hungaria)Out

  Jacqueline Anastácio (to Gjøvik HK)  Adrienn Bognár (to Aalborg DH)  Zsanett Hanczvikkel (to Veszprém Barabás KC)  Boglárka Hosszu (to Dunaújvárosi NKS)  Regina Hrankai (to Veszprém Barabás KC)  Silvia Pinheiro (to Hypo Niederösterreich)  Andrea Scholtz (to Kiskunhalas NKSE)  Zsuzsanna Tóth (to Budaörs-Érdi VSE II)UKSE Szekszárd

In

  Rita Borbás (from DVSC-Fórum)  Edina Burai (from ÉTV-Érdi VSE)Out

  Ibolya Beck
  Zsuzsanna Hegyi (to SG BBM Bietigheim)  Petra Horváth (to Mohácsi TE)  Szimonetta Horváth (retired)  Orsolya Jankovics
  Nóra Kovács (to HF Kroppskultur Dam)  Dorina Mizsák (to Mohácsi TE)  Virág Rózsa Samu (to Veszprém Barabás KC)  Edina Szabó (to Kispesti NKK)Váci NKSE

In

  Krisztina Gyetván (from ÉTV-Érdi VSE)'  Katarina Miklosová (from Kispesti NKK)  Orsolya Szegedi (from VKLSE Győr)Out

  Orsolya Herr (to Siófok KC-Galerius Fürdő)  Erika Kirsner (retired)  Lilla Németh (to Hypo Niederösterreich)  Nikolett Pomozi 
  Viktória Rédei Soós (to Hypo Niederösterreich)  Flóra Sipeki (to Budapest Bank-Békéscsabai Előre NKSE)  Bernadett Temes (to Hypo Niederösterreich)  Virág Vaszari (to Alcoa FKC RightPhone)Veszprém Barabás KC

In

  Fruzsina Azari (from Alcoa FKC RightPhone)  Anita Bulath (from DVSC-Fórum)  Dóra Dublinszki (from DVSC-Fórum)  Zsanett Hanczvikkel (from Siófok KC-Galerius Fürdő)  Réka Herceg (from Kecskeméti NKSE)  Regina Hrankai (from Siófok KC-Galerius Fürdő)  Gabriella Juhász (from DVSC-Fórum)  Éva Kiss (from DVSC-Fórum)  Maja Mayer (from FTC-Rail Cargo Hungaria)  Szabina Mayer (from Győri Audi ETO KC)  Ivett Nagy (from Dunaújvárosi NKS)  Rózsa Virág Samu (from UKSE Szekszárd)  Sarolta Selmeczi (from Dunaújvárosi NKS)Out

  Szilvia Ábrahám (to Siófok KC-Galerius Fürdő)  Renáta Gerstmár (to Dunaújvárosi NKS)  Kitti Hoffmann (to Kispesti NKK)  Annamária Király (to DVSC-Fórum)  Viktória Koroknai 
  Katalin Koszorús (retired)  Ibolya Mehlmann (to RK Krim Ljubljana)  Andrea Sterbik (to Kiskunhalas NKSE)  Szilvia Tarjányi (to Budapest Bank-Békéscsabai Előre NKSE)  Judit Veszeli (retired)''

References

External links
Hungarian Handball Federation regulations on the status and transfer of players 

Hand
2011 in women's handball
Handball in Hungary
Hungarian
Handball